Appeal to Human Greed is a remix EP by GOD, released on 10 October 1995 through Big Cat. It contains five remixed tracks from the group's second album, The Anatomy of Addiction.

Track listing

Personnel 
Justin Broadrick – production on "On All Fours"
Colm Ó Cíosóig – engineering on "Tunnel"
Tony Cousins – mastering
Bill Laswell – production on "Bloodstream"
Chris Lovejoy – drums and bells on "Gold Teeth"
The Lumberjacks – production on "Gold Teeth"
Kevin Martin – production on "Bloodstream", cover art
Robert Musso – engineering on "Bloodstream"
Kevin Shields – production on "Tunnel"

References 

1995 EPs
1995 remix albums
Big Cat Records albums
God (British band) albums